Diatraea maronialis is a moth in the family Crambidae. It was described by Schaus in 1922. It is found in French Guiana.

References

Chiloini
Moths described in 1922